is a Japanese football player. He plays for Azul Claro Numazu.

Career
Takuya Sugai joined Japan Football League club Vanraure Hachinohe in 2014. In 2017, he moved to J3 League club Azul Claro Numazu.

Club statistics
Updated to 14 April 2020.

References

External links
Profile at Azul Claro Numazu

1991 births
Living people
Sendai University alumni
Association football people from Miyagi Prefecture
Japanese footballers
Japan Football League players
J3 League players
Vanraure Hachinohe players
Azul Claro Numazu players
Association football defenders